Library of Congress Police  was a federal law enforcement agency of the Library of Congress in Washington, D.C., headed by the Office of the Librarian. The agency was formed in 1950. In 2004 the Police employed 116 officers.

Library of Congress Police officers provided facility security through uniformed patrols and video surveillance as well as law enforcement services through arrest authority granted by the United States Congress.

In 2003, the Library Of Congress police were merged into the United States Capitol Police. The U.S. Capitol Police now protects Library of Congress buildings.

Merger
In 2003, Congress decided to begin to abolish the LOC Police force, transferring the officers and the agency's duties, responsibilities and functions into the United States Capitol Police. Pursuant to Public Law 108-7 Sec. 1015 (117 Stat. 363) put into effect by the U.S. Congress on February 20, 2003, the Library of Congress Police was transferred to the authority of the U.S. Capitol Police, and all sections under Title 2 (§ 167 and § 167h) of the U.S. Code that pertains to the Library of Congress Police was transferred to the U.S. Capitol Police. On September 30, 2009, the merger was completed and the Library of Congress Police have been merged into the U.S. Capitol Police to create one police force.  On October 1, 2009, the Library of Congress police ceased operations. The duties previously performed by them were assumed by the U.S. Capitol Police.

See also

 List of United States federal law enforcement agencies

References

External links
Library Security page at the Library of Congress

Defunct federal law enforcement agencies of the United States
Agency-specific police departments of the United States
Library of Congress
United States Capitol Police
Defunct organizations based in Washington, D.C.